The Tulane European & Civil Law is a predominantly faculty-run law journal published out of the Tulane University Law School.  The Journal's Board of Contributing Editors is made up of 51 scholars from ten European countries and the United States.

Rankings
The Journal has been ranked #2 out of 18 peer-edited law journals in the world, and #1 out of 3 European Law peer-edited journals in the United States.

References

American law journals
Tulane University Law School
Annual journals